Oscar Eduardo Suárez Parra (born April 10, 1995, in Guanajuato City, Guanajuato) is a professional Mexican association football (soccer) player who currently plays for Cimarrones de Sonora.

External links
 
 

Living people
1995 births
Mexican footballers
Association football forwards
Club León footballers
Mineros de Zacatecas players
Cimarrones de Sonora players
Liga MX players
Ascenso MX players
Liga Premier de México players
Tercera División de México players
Footballers from Guanajuato
People from Guanajuato City